Poul Petersen may refer to:

 Poul Petersen (footballer) (1921–1997), Danish footballer and Olympic bronze medalist (1960)
 Poul Petersen (swimmer) (1912–1959), Danish swimmer
 Poul Erik Petersen (1927–1992), Danish Olympic footballer (1952)
 Poul Petersen (actor) (1905–1986), Danish actor and theater director, in Affæren Birte
 Poul Petersen (badminton), Danish badminton player
 PVP Karting, a racing kart manufacturer founded and run by Poul V Petersen

See also
 Poul Pedersen (1932–2017), Danish footballer and  Olympic silver medalist (1948)
 Poul Pedersen (cinematographer) (1925-2003), American cinematographer for Danish films